The Spanish Village Art Center is located in San Diego's Balboa Park, in the U.S. state of California. Anni von Westrum Baldaugh was among the artists who had studio space at the Spanish Village. Current tenants include the San Diego Mineral and Gem Society and the Southern California Association of Camera Clubs.

References

External links

 

Balboa Park (San Diego)